Heide Paula Perlman (born September 22, 1951) is best known for her work as a television script writer.  Perlman began work as a writer on the sitcom Cheers from 1982 through 1986; since then she has worked as a writer, producer and/or story editor on The Tracey Ullman Show, Frasier, The George Carlin Show, Stacked, The Bill Engvall Show and others.  She has won two Primetime Emmy Awards and has been nominated for eight others.

She is the younger sister of Cheers actress Rhea Perlman.

References

External links

 

1951 births
American people of Polish-Jewish descent
American people of Russian-Jewish descent
American television writers
Living people
People from Brooklyn
Primetime Emmy Award winners
Screenwriters from New York (state)
Television producers from New York City
American women television producers
American women television writers
21st-century American women